Oriaku Njoku is an American activist for reproductive rights. In 2022, they were appointed executive director of the National Network of Abortion Funds. 
Njoku goes by she and they pronouns.

Njoku's parents moved to the U.S. from Nigeria.  During childhood, Njoku lived in Michigan, Indiana, and Bowling Green, Kentucky. They attended the University of Kentucky, where they came out as queer.

Njoku co-founded and served as executive director of Access Reproductive Care-Southeast, an abortion fund based in Atlanta.

Njoku was included in the Time 100 Next 2022 List.

Publications

References

Living people
1980s births
African-American activists
Activists from Atlanta
American abortion-rights activists
American people of Nigerian descent
LGBT African Americans
University of Kentucky alumni